Statistics of Primera División de México in season 1988–89.

Overview
It was contested by 20 teams, and América won the championship.

Cobras was promoted from Segunda División.

Atlético Potosino was relegated to Segunda División.

Teams

Group stage

Group 1

Group 2

Group 3

Group 4

Results

Playoff

Semifinal

Group 1

Group 2

Final

America won 5-4 on aggregate.

References
Mexico - List of final tables (RSSSF)

Liga MX seasons
Mex
1988–89 in Mexican football